The 2024 United States Senate election in New Mexico will be held on November 5, 2024, to elect a member of the United States Senate to represent the state of New Mexico. Incumbent two-term Democratic Senator Martin Heinrich was re-elected with 54.1% of the vote in 2018.

Democratic primary

Candidates

Declared
Martin Heinrich, incumbent U.S. Senator

General election

Predictions

References

External links
Official campaign websites 
Martin Heinrich (D) for Senate

2024
New Mexico
United States Senate